Evert Johanson (19 December 1918 – 25 May 2000) was a Norwegian boxer. He competed in the men's middleweight event at the 1948 Summer Olympics. At the 1948 Summer Olympics, he lost to Martin Hansen of Denmark.

References

External links
 

1918 births
2000 deaths
Norwegian male boxers
Olympic boxers of Norway
Boxers at the 1948 Summer Olympics
People from Buskerud
Middleweight boxers
Sportspeople from Viken (county)